Westland Mall may refer to:
Westland Mall (Hialeah), a shopping mall in Hialeah, Florida
Westland Mall (West Burlington), a shopping mall in West Burlington, Iowa
Westland Mall (Columbus), a defunct shopping mall in Columbus, Ohio
Westland Mall (Louisville), also known as Park Place Mall, a defunct mall in Louisville, Kentucky

See also
Westland Town Center, formerly Westland Mall, in Lakewood, Colorado
 Westland Center, a shopping mall in Fort Wayne, Indiana
Westland Center, a shopping mall in Westland, Michigan